Peter Holm (1733–1817) was a government official and topographical writer in Denmark-Norway.  He served as a County Governor for three different counties in Norway.  He was the County Governor of Nordland county from 1767–1771, of Bratsberg county from 1771–1773, and of Lister og Mandal county from 1773 until his retirement on 31 December 1805. After the union between Denmark and Norway ended in 1814. Holm did not return to his birth country of Denmark, but stayed in Norway, and died in Christiansand in 1817.

References

1733 births
1817 deaths
County governors of Norway
County governors of Nordland